Diamond, West Virginia may refer to:
Diamond, Kanawha County, West Virginia, an unincorporated community in Kanawha County
Diamond, Logan County, West Virginia, an unincorporated community in Logan County